Blažkov is a municipality and village in Žďár nad Sázavou District in the Vysočina Region of the Czech Republic. It has about 300 inhabitants.

Administrative parts
The village of Dolní Rozsíčka is an administrative part of Blažkov.

References

Villages in Žďár nad Sázavou District